D'Alembert may refer to:

 Jean le Rond d'Alembert
 the D'Alembert operator, named after the former
 D'Alembert's principle, also named after the above
 D'Alembert's equation, also named after the above
 D'Alembert's formula, also named after the above
 D'Alembert's theorem, another name for the fundamental theorem of algebra, also named after the above.
 a lunar crater, also named after the above
 Family D'Alembert, a series of science fiction novels

See also
Jean Baptiste Joseph Delambre